Kings was a provincial electoral district in Nova Scotia, Canada that, at the time of its dissolution, elected two members to the Nova Scotia House of Assembly. It existed from 1867 until 1956, when Kings County was divided into the three electoral districts of Kings North, Kings South and Kings West. Apart from a brief period between 1933 and 1945, during which one member was elected, Kings always elected two members to the Legislature.

Members of the Legislative Assembly 
Kings elected the following members to the Legislature:

*NB Dodge died in office on December 30, 1910. Wickwire was elected to replace him in a by-election on January 31, 1911. Wickwire was then re-elected in the Nova Scotia general election held on June 14, 1911.

Election results

1867 general election

1871 general election

1874 general election

1878 general election

1882 general election

1886 general election

1890 general election

1894 general election

1897 general election

1901 general election

1906 general election

1911 general election

1916 general election

1920 general election

1925 general election

1928 general election

1933 general election

1937 general election

1941 general election

1945 general election

1949 general election

1953 general election

References

Former provincial electoral districts of Nova Scotia